Hidden Hospitals is an alternative progressive rock band from Chicago, Illinois. The band was originally formed from members of the bands Damiera and Kiss Kiss (band). They released their first EP,  EP 001, in September 2011. They played their first show September 6, 2011 at the Bottom Lounge in Chicago. Their next album, EP 002, was released in October 2012. Hidden Hospitals has supported many national acts including Blindside (band), Hot Rod Circuit, Cartel (band), Middle Class Rut, Now, Now, Kevin Devine and The Used.  2013 saw the band release EP 001 + EP 002 on a combined vinyl and go on two national tours in support of the release.
In 2015 band released their LP Surface tension.

Discography

EP 001 (2011)

EP 001 was released on September 1, 2011. For the initial release, the band packaged together packs of five download cards that were individually stamped and signed with hand written codes.  The packs were banded together with vellum and sealed with a |+| wax seal.  These cards were sent to friends and family as well as press and industry.  The album was recorded in Nashville, Tennessee, and produced by J. Hall.

This EP contained five songs: "Atonement", "One to Ones", "Controlled Chaos", "Swan Dive", and "Poet & Liar."

EP 002 (2012)

EP 002 released 30 October 2012.  The album was produced and mixed by J. Hall.

This EP contained five songs: "Featherweight," "The Absence of Emotion," "Picture Perfect," "Monsters,"  and "Lullaby."

Surface Tension (2015)
 Pulp
 Rose Hips
 Modern Saints
 History
 Wounded Sirens
 Bone Scraper
 Trilogy 
 Synesthesia 
 Animals 
 Broken Skeletons 
 From Toxin 
 Surface Tension

Liars (2018) 

 Razor Blades
 Liars
 Smile & Wave
 Better Off
 Acid Rain
 Pulling Teeth
 Typecast 
 Memories
 Taking Sides
 The Weeds

References

Musical groups from Chicago
Musical groups established in 2011
Progressive rock musical groups from Illinois
2011 establishments in Illinois